The Ordo Monattorum is a goliardic corporation of the Università Cattolica del Sacro Cuore.

History
The group was created in 1922 in Milan, only a year after the founding of UCSC. Students belonging to this order are nicknamed Monatti.

See also
 Goliardia
 UCSC Student Associations

Notes

External links
Official website

Università Cattolica del Sacro Cuore
Student organizations established in 1922
University folklore